= Ammiunttion Siding railway station =

Railway station in Pakistan

Ammiunttion Siding railway station امیونٹشن سائیڈنگ ریلوے اسٹیشن

General information
- Owner: Ministry of Railways

Other information
- Station code: AMSB

History
- Former names: Great Indian Peninsula Railway

Ammiunttion Siding railway station (Urdu: امیونٹشن سائیڈنگ ریلوے اسٹیشن) is located in Pakistan.

== See also ==
- List of railway stations in Pakistan
- Pakistan Railways
